Oatfield is an unincorporated community and census-designated place in Clackamas County, Oregon, United States. It is in the Portland metropolitan area. As of the 2010 census, the population of the CDP was 13,415.

It is named after Oatfield Road, which runs between Milwaukie and Gladstone. Oatfield Road was named for the Oatfield family, well-known pioneers of the area.

Geography
Oatfield is located in northwestern Clackamas County and is bordered by the city of Milwaukie to the northwest, unincorporated Oak Grove to the west, unincorporated Jennings Lodge to the southwest, and the city of Gladstone to the south. Interstate 205 forms the eastern edge of the community, separating Oatfield from unincorporated Clackamas. Oatfield also completely surrounds the small city of Johnson City.

Demographics

As of the census of 2000, there were 15,750 people, 5,903 households, and 4,563 families residing in the CDP. The population density was 3,608.1 people per square mile (1,391.6/km2). There were 6,110 housing units at an average density of 1,399.7 per square mile (539.8/km2). The racial makeup of the CDP was 93.43% White, 0.47% African American, 0.53% Native American, 1.99% Asian, 0.12% Pacific Islander, 0.93% from other races, and 2.52% from two or more races. Hispanic or Latino of any race were 2.64% of the population.

There were 5,903 households, out of which 30.6% had children under the age of 18 living with them, 65.9% were married couples living together, 8.5% had a female householder with no husband present, and 22.7% were non-families. 17.8% of all households were made up of individuals, and 7.1% had someone living alone who was 65 years of age or older. The average household size was 2.65 and the average family size was 2.99.

In the CDP, the population was spread out, with 23.2% under the age of 18, 7.0% from 18 to 24, 24.7% from 25 to 44, 30.8% from 45 to 64, and 14.4% who were 65 years of age or older. The median age was 42 years. For every 100 females, there were 95.2 males. For every 100 females age 18 and over, there were 92.3 males.

The median income for a household in the CDP was $59,769, and the median income for a family was $66,469. Males had a median income of $46,351 versus $33,247 for females. The per capita income for the CDP was $25,148. About 2.9% of families and 4.2% of the population were below the poverty line, including 4.5% of those under age 18 and 4.0% of those age 65 or over.

References

External links
 1939 oral history memoir from Minerva Fessing Oatfield (an acquaintance of Abigail Scott Duniway), on the Library of Congress website

Census-designated places in Oregon
Portland metropolitan area
Unincorporated communities in Clackamas County, Oregon
Census-designated places in Clackamas County, Oregon
Unincorporated communities in Oregon